Fuchsia luteella is a species of moth of the family Depressariidae. It is found in the Czech Republic, Slovakia, Austria, Romania and North Macedonia.

The larvae feed on Peucedanum cervaria.

References

External links
lepiforum.de

Moths described in 1870
Depressariinae
Moths of Europe